Nishizawa is a Japanese surname. Notable people with the surname include:

 Akinori Nishizawa, Japanese footballer
 Hiroyoshi Nishizawa, Japanese World War II flying ace
 Jun-ichi Nishizawa, Japanese engineer
 Junji Nishizawa, Japanese footballer
, Japanese footballer
 Luis Nishizawa, Mexican artist
 Michio Nishizawa, Japanese baseball player
 Ryue Nishizawa, Japanese architect
 Shiena Nishizawa, Japanese pop rock singer
 Yoshiko Nishizawa, a fictional character from the anime/manga series Strike Witches
 Yoshiya Nishizawa, Japanese footballer

Japanese-language surnames